Creoleon elegans is a species of antlions (neuropteran insects in the family Myrmeleontidae) in the subfamily Myrmeleontinae. It is found in Iran.

References

External links 
 
 Creoleon elegans at insectoid.info

Myrmeleontinae
Insects described in 1968